This is the list of the metropolitanates and eparchies (dioceses) of the Russian Orthodox Church.

Russia
Eparchies and metropolitanates of the Russian Orthodox Church in the Russian Federation:

Belarus

Eparchies of the Belarusian Exarchate of the Russian Orthodox Church in Belarus:

Ukraine

Eparchies of Ukrainian Orthodox Church (Moscow Patriarchate) (and its predecessor Exarchate of Ukraine): In May 2022 the Ukrainian Orthodox Church (Moscow Patriarchate) itself excluded ‘any provisions that at least somehow hinted at or indicated the connection with Moscow’ (following the 2022 Russian invasion of Ukraine); this act was ignored by the Russian Orthodox Church.

Latvia
Eparchies of the Latvian Orthodox Church:

Estonia
Eparchies of the Estonian Orthodox Church of Moscow Patriarchate:

Moldova

Eparchies of the Moldovan Orthodox Church:

Former Soviet Republics

Eparchies of the Russian Orthodox Church in Central Asia, Azerbaijan and Lithuania:

Japan
Eparchies of the Japanese Orthodox Church:

Outside former Soviet Union
Eparchies of the Russian Orthodox Church outside former Soviet Union:

Russian Orthodox Church Outside Russia
Eparchies of the Russian Orthodox Church Outside Russia:

See also
Edinoverie
Eparchies of the Serbian Orthodox Church
Eparchies of the Romanian Orthodox Church
Eparchies of the Georgian Orthodox Church

References 

 
Russian
Russia religion-related lists